The Boston Finance Commission (known as FinComm) is an agency that monitors finances for the city of Boston. It is concerned with appropriations, loans, expenditures, accounts, and methods of administration affecting the city of Boston and Suffolk County (of which Boston is the county seat).

Public meetings
Public meetings of the FinComm are open to observers interested in municipal government.

References
April 2008 http://www.cityofboston.gov/cable/video_library.asp?id=1050

External links
 official website
 Reports of the Boston Finance Commission, via Hathi Trust.

Organizations based in Boston
Government of Boston